Catherine Burelle (born 21 February 1959) is a Belgian sprint canoer who competed in the mid-1970s. She was eliminated in the repechages of the K-2 500 m event at the 1976 Summer Olympics in Montreal.

References
Sports-reference.com profile

1959 births
Belgian female canoeists
Canoeists at the 1976 Summer Olympics
Living people
Olympic canoeists of Belgium
Place of birth missing (living people)